The 2019–20 season is Independiente's 7th consecutive season in the top division of Argentine football. In addition to the Primera División, the club are competing in the Copa Argentina, Copa de la Superliga and Copa Sudamericana.

The season generally covers the period from 1 July 2019 to 30 June 2020.

Review

Pre-season
Brown completed the loan signing of young midfielder Elías Contreras on 26 June 2019. Independiente purchased centre-back Alexander Barboza from River Plate on 29 June. Numerous loans from the previous campaign officially expired on and around 30 June. Saúl Nelle was loaned out to Nueva Chicago on 1 July. Temperley announced the incoming of Nicolás Messiniti on 2 July. A goal from Alan Franco helped them beat Temperley in their opening pre-season friendly on 3 July, which preceded a further victory soon after following strikes from Mauro Molina, Fernando Chávez and Diego Mercado. Hours later, Damián Martínez joined Unión Santa Fe permanently; having spent 2016–17 and 2017–18 on loan. Independiente failed to defeat Platense in two friendlies on 6 July.

Independiente communicated their second transaction on 8 July, as Cristian Chávez was captured from Aldosivi. Independiente fell to back-to-back exhibition losses on 10 July at home to Arsenal de Sarandí. Andrés Roa, who had been on loan with Huracán in the past season, was signed on a full-time contract from Deportivo Cali on 12 July. Nicolás Del Priore went out on loan to Villa Dálmine on 12 July. Independiente put eight goals past Aldosivi in pre-season matches on 13 July, though the secondary encounter was against their reserves. Lucas Albertengo headed on loan to Newell's Old Boys on 13 July. Fernando Gaibor agreed terms with Al-Wasl of the United Arab Emirates on 15 July. Tristán Suárez confirmed the loan of Mauricio del Castillo on 17 July.

Sergio Alegre, an attacking midfielder, left for Estudiantes (BA) on 19 July. Independiente lost to Newell's Old Boys in an opening friendly on 17 July, though responded with a victory later in the day thanks to a Silvio Romero hat-trick. On 20 July, Independiente met Temperley for the third time in pre-season, in Wilde, and played out a tie. Jony went off to Talleres on loan on 25 July. Sebastián Palacios transferred from Liga MX's Pachuca on 25 July.

July
Ecuador's Universidad Católica were defeated in the Copa Sudamericana round of sixteen on 25 July, as Pablo Hernández's goal gave Independiente a first leg advantage. Villa Dálmine signed reserve team player Sergio Díaz on 26 July. 28 July saw Independiente start their 2019–20 Primera División campaign with three points on the road against Defensa y Justicia.

August
Gonzalo Verón left on loan to Aldosivi on 1 August. Chilean central midfielder Francisco Silva made a return to his homeland on 2 August, as he agreed a contract with Universidad Católica. Newell's matchday two fixture with Newell's Old Boys in the Primera División and their Copa Argentina tie with Patronato were postponed in early August, due to scheduling conflicts with CONMEBOL regarding Independiente's quarter-final tie in the Copa Sudamericana. Lucas Romero became Independiente's fifth reinforcement for 2019–20 as he arrived from Brazil's Cruzeiro on 5 August. Independiente came from behind to defeat Independiente del Valle in a Copa Sudamericana quarter-final first leg on 6 August. Gastón del Castillo agreed a move to Atlético Saltillo Soccer on 9 August.

Independiente drew and lost to Gimnasia y Esgrima in friendlies on 10 August. Independiente were eliminated from the Copa Sudamericana on 13 August, as a Dani Nieto strike put Independiente del Valle through to the semi-finals on away goals. Independiente suffered their fourth competitive loss of 2019–20 on 19 August, as they conceded three unanswered goals away to Estudiantes in the Primera División. Independiente achieved their third win in four league matches on 24 August, having beaten Colón at home after a Lucas Acevedo own-goal was coupled with a late Lucas Romero strike. Independiente progressed through to the round of sixteen in the Copa Argentina on 28 August, eliminating Patronato after a narrow one-goal victory at the Estadio Único de Villa Mercedes.

Days later, on 31 August, Independiente and Patronato faced each other again in league action as Patronato reversed the scoreline.

Squad

Transfers
Domestic transfer windows:3 July 2019 to 24 September 201920 January 2020 to 19 February 2020.

Transfers in

Transfers out

Loans out

Friendlies

Pre-season
Arsenal de Sarandí were revealed to be a pre-season opponent of Independiente on 11 June 2019, as were Aldosivi on 24 June. Matches with Temperley, Platense and Newell's Old Boys was scheduled for 3/6/17 July. A encounter match with Temperley was set for 21 July.

Mid-season
Independiente travelled to Villa Domínico for friendlies with Gimnasia y Esgrima on 10 August.

Competitions

Primera División

League table

Relegation table

Source: AFA

Results summary

Matches
The fixtures for the 2019–20 campaign were released on 10 July.

Copa Argentina

Independiente were drawn to meet Patronato in the Copa Argentina R32.

Copa de la Superliga

Copa Sudamericana

Universidad Católica of the Ecuadorian Serie A were, on 3 June 2019, revealed to be Independiente's opponents in the Copa Sudamericana round of sixteen. They defeated Universidad Católica, which saw them advance to the quarter-finals where they'd face another trip to Ecuador in Independiente del Valle.

Squad statistics

Appearances and goals

Statistics accurate as of 31 August 2019.

Goalscorers

Notes

References

Club Atlético Independiente seasons
Independiente